Field hockey was contested at the 1991 Summer Universiade in Sheffield, England.

References
 Universiade field hockey medalists on HickokSports

Universaiie
1991 Summer Universiade
Universiade